is a Brazilian former footballer and commentator of Japanese descent who played as a midfielder.

He joined the Corinthians in 1963 and played for Towa Real Estate S.C. in the Japan Soccer League between 1972 and 1974.

Playing style
A highly technical player, Echigo was renowned for his feints and dribbling skills. He is responsible for inventing the dribbling move known as 'Elastico', or 'flip-flap', a move which Brazilian legend Rivelino acquired from him and perfected while they were teammates at Corinthians in 1964.

Honours

Club
Towa Estate Development
 JSL Cup: 1973

Individual
 Japan Soccer League Best Eleven: 1973, 1974
Order of the Rising Sun, 5th Class, Gold and Silver Rays: 2017

References

External links
  
 Twitter 

1945 births
Living people
Footballers from São Paulo
Brazilian people of Japanese descent
Brazilian footballers
Sport Club Corinthians Paulista players
Japan Soccer League players
Shonan Bellmare players
Association football midfielders
Association football forwards